"Rihanna" is a song by Nigerian singer Orezi, released on February 18, 2013. The song was produced by Kiddominant. Orezi recorded "Rihanna" while signed to Culbeed Music. The music video for "Rihanna" peaked at number 1 on Pulse Nigeria's music video chart. He shot the video after signing with Sprisal Entertainment, a record label owned by Jibola Fatgbems of Fatgbems Oil.

Music video background
The music video for "Rihanna" was shot and directed in South Africa. The song was initially scheduled for release on Valentine's Day, but was pushed back due to Goldie Harvey's death. Orezi told Showtime Celebrity he decided to feature a Rihanna look-alike in the music video after all efforts to get the Barbadian singer proved unsuccessful. Orezi's management was able to get a Mauritian girl named Kim to play Rihanna in the video. Orezi also told Showtime Celebrity he shot the "Rihanna" video in South Africa in order to achieve something different. It was alleged that Orezi's management spent over ₦7.3 million on the video shoot.

In June 2014, the music video for "Rihanna" made YouTube Nation's compiled list of the "8 Incredible Music Videos from Around the World".

Accolades
"Rihanna" was nominated for Best Reggae/Dancehall Single at the 2013 edition of The Headies. The music video for "Rihanna" won Best Dance Hall/Reggae Video at the 2013 Nigeria Music Video Awards. Moreover, it was nominated for Most Gifted Ragga Dancehall at the 2014 Channel O Music Video Awards.

Track listing and cover
 Digital singles

Release history

References

External links

2013 songs
2013 singles
Rihanna
Song recordings produced by Kiddominant